The siege of Algeciras was a battle of the Spanish Reconquista that occurred between July 1309 and January 1310. The battle was fought between the forces of the Kingdom of Castile, commanded by King Ferdinand IV of Castile and his vassals, and the Emirate of Granada commanded by Sultan Abu'l-Juyush Nasr. The battle resulted in a humiliating defeat for the Kingdom of Castile whose army was obliged to lift the siege due to the atrocious conditions of life in the Castilian camp and the desertion of Infante John of Castile. The battle marked one of the many battles fought at Algeciras where the Christian forces would try to take the city unsuccessfully from the Muslims.

Context 
On December 19, 1308, at Alcalá de Henares, King Ferdinand IV of Castile and the ambassadors from the Kingdom of Aragon, Bernaldo de Sarriá and Gonzalo García agreed to the terms of the Treaty of Alcalá de Henares. Ferdinand IV, supported by his brother, Pedro de Castilla y Molina, the archbishop of Toledo, the bishop of Zamora, and Diego Lopez V de Haro agreed to initiate a war against the Kingdom of Granada on June 24, 1309. It was agreed that the Aragonese monarch could not sign a separate peace accord with the Emir of Granada. A combined Aragonese-Castilian navy was also formed to support the siege in a blockade of the coastal Granadian towns. It was further agreed that the Kingdom of Castile would attack the towns of Algeciras and Gibraltar and that the Aragonese forces would conquer the city of Almería.

Ferdinand IV promised to cede one sixth of the conquered Granadan territory to the Aragonese crown and therefore chose the entirety of the Kingdom of Almeria as its limits fit the agreement with the exception of the towns of :es:BedmarBedmar, Alcaudete, Quesada, Arenas, and Locubin which would stay with Castile, having all previously been part of the Kingdom of Castile and León prior to their Muslim takeovers. Ferdinand IV further stipulated that if the lands taken from the Kingdom of Almeria did not amount to one sixth of Granadan territory, that the archbishop of Toledo would step in to resolve any differences related to the matter. These concessions to the Kingdom of Aragon led a few of Ferdinand IV's vassals to protest the ratification of the treaty, amongst them were John of Castile and Juan Manuel.

The concessions to Aragon, which had begun a period of relative irrelevancy compared to Castile, would make the kingdom once again very powerful on the Iberian Peninsula. Aragon had previously reached its height under the Treaty of Cazola and the Treaty of Almizra which saw its territory and influence expand considerably. Ferdinand insisted on the Aragonese alliance to cement an alliance between Aragon and the king of Morocco so that they would not intervene in the coming war with Granada.

After the signing of the treaty at Alcala de Henares, Castile and Aragon both sent emissaries to the court at Avignon to gain the support of Pope Clement V and to obtain the clerical backing of an official Crusade to further support military operations. They also asked for the papal blessing of a marriage between the infanta Leonor de Castilla, the firstborn daughter of Ferdinand IV and Jaime de Aragón y Anjou, son and heir of James II of Aragon. The pope agreed to both ventures and on 24 April 1309, Clement V issuel the papal bull Indesinentis cure which authorized general crusade against Granada to conquer the Iberian Peninsula together with mandates to conquer Corsica and Sardinia.

At the Courts of Madrid of 1309, the first courts ever occurring in the actual Spanish capital, Ferdinand IV publicly announced his desire to wage war against the Kingdom of Granada and demanded subsidies to begin battle maneuvers.

Many of the magnates under the Castilian banner were against the siege, this camp being led by John of Castile and Don Juan Manuel who both preferred a war of attrition and purely for profit in the area of Vega de Granada. The infante John was further angry with the king because he was not given title over the municipality of Ponferrada. Don Juan Manuel was dissatisfied because he preferred to wage war against Granada from his home territories in Murcia and did not want to fight in the Algeciras area. To add to these misgivings, it is important to note that Algeciras had been the principal Muslim stronghold on the Iberian Peninsula since the Moors first landed there and was extremely well fortified.

Differences aside, the Castilian forces gathered in Toledo from where they would commence operations. Ferdinand IV left his mother, María de Molina in charge of governmental operations in his absence.

Christian mobilization 
The main vassals contributing troops to operations against Algeciras were the infante John of Castile, Don Juan Manuel, Diego Lopez V de Haro, lord of Biscay, Juan Núñez II de Lara, Fernán Ruiz de Saldaña and Alonso Pérez de Guzmán. A large portion of the troops fielded by Castile were also gathered from the civil militia councils of Salamanca, Segovia, Seville and other cities.

Denis of Portugal, a relative of Ferdinand IV, sent 700 knights under the command of Martín Gil de Sousa, his Alférez. James II of Aragon, whose forces were attacking other parts of Granada, contributed 10 galleys to the Algeciras blockade force. On 29 April 1309, Pope Clement V issued a papal bull Prioribus decanis which officially conceded to Ferdinand IV one 10th of all clergy taxes collected in his kingdoms for three years to aid in financing the siege

From Toledo, Ferdinand IV and his army marched to Córdoba where the emissaries of the James II announced that the Aragonese king was prepared to launch the siege against the city of Almeria. Final preparations for the siege were carried out in Seville, where Ferdinand IV arrived in July 1309. The supply train for the invasion army passed through Seville and crossed the Guadalquivir River and traveled by sea to Algeciras.

The siege 
On 27 July 1309, the vanguard of the Castilian army reached the walls of Algeciras, followed three days later on 30 July by the king and his entourage. James II of Aragon began his siege of Almeria on the 15th of August of that same year, a siege that would last until 26 January 1310. While Algeciras was being besieged, Christian forces fighting for Castile under the command of Juan Núñez II de Lara and Alonso Pérez de Guzmán took the city of Gibraltar on 12 September 1309 leading to a major boost in morale for the Castilian army.

In mid October 1309, the infante John of Castile, his son, Alfonso de Valencia, Don Juan Manuel and Fernán Ruiz de Saldaña together with about 500 knights, deserted and abandoned the Christian encampment citing poor living conditions and dissatisfaction with the king due to a delay in the arrival of their pay. This betrayal provoked the indignation of courts all across Europe, being considered so incomprehensible that James II of Aragon himself rode after the traitors to unsuccessfully attempt to convince them to return to the siege. Regardless, Ferdinand IV maintained the support of Juan Núñez II de Lara, who had earlier proved himself by conquering Granada, and of Diego Lopez V de Haro and they decided to continue their attempts to retake the city.

The squalor in the Christian camp by the River Andarax eventually reached such alarming proportions that Ferdinand IV was obliged to sell off the jewelry of his wife, Constance of Portugal to pay the soldiers and knights for their continued service. The Christian forces were soon reinforced by a large army sent by the infante Felipe de Castilla y Molina and another sent by the Archbishop of Santiago de Compostela who arrived at the head of 400 knights and a great number of footsoldiers.

Towards the end of 1309, the siege began to go very poorly for Ferdinand IV as many of his commanders began to fall ill. Diego Lopez V de Haro was afflicted with gout and Alonso Pérez de Guzmán died in camp. Temporal rains also completely flooded the area where the Christian forces had camped making a breeding ground for disease and illness. Ferdinand IV of Castile persisted until January 1310 in his efforts to take the city when he finally abandoned hope of a victorious outcome and retreated.

Aftermath 
In January 1310, Ferdinand IV began negotiations with the Kingdom of Granada. An accord was reached stipulating that in return for lifting the siege, Ferdinand IV would receive the border towns of Quesada, Quadros, Belmar and a payment of 5,000 golden pistoles. After the signing of this peace treaty, Diego Lopez V de Haro died in camp at Algeciras and Maria II Diaz de Haro, wife of the infante John of Castile, took possession of the Lordship of Biscay.

Almost simultaneously with the Castilian defeat at Algeciras, James II of Aragon ordered a lifting of the unsuccessful siege of Almeria by the Kingdom of Aragon.

The campaign of 1309–10 was successful for Ferdinand IV even though he did not conquer Algeciras, as the city of Gibraltar was incorporated into Castile.

References

Bibliography

See also 
 Siege of Gibraltar (1309)
 Juan Núñez II de Lara
 Juan Manuel, Prince of Villena
 Infante John of Castile
 Diego López V de Haro
 Ferdinand IV of Castile

1309 in Europe
1310 in Europe
Algeciras
Algeciras
14th century in Al-Andalus
Algeciras 1309
Algeciras (1309)
Algeciras
Order of Santiago
Algeciras 1309
14th century in Castile